Bolong River, a watercourse that is part of the Lachlan catchment within the Murray–Darling basin, is located in the central–western region of New South Wales, Australia.

See also

 Rivers of New South Wales
 List of rivers of Australia

References

External links
 

Rivers of New South Wales
Murray-Darling basin